Long Marton is a civil parish in the Eden District, Cumbria, England. It contains 36 listed buildings that are recorded in the National Heritage List for England. Of these, one is listed at Grade I, the highest of the three grades, and the others are at Grade II, the lowest grade.  The parish contains the villages of Long Marton, Brampton, and Knock, and the surrounding countryside.  Most of the listed buildings are houses and associated structures, farmhouse and farm buildings.  The other listed buildings include a church, a chapel, public houses, a railway goods shed and offices, and a telephone kiosk.


Key

Buildings

Notes and references

Notes

Citations

Sources

Lists of listed buildings in Cumbria